Cellena is a village in Tuscany, central Italy, administratively a frazione of the comune of Semproniano, province of Grosseto. At the time of the 2001 census its population amounted to 77.

Geography 
Cellena is about 54 km from Grosseto and 6 km from Semproniano. The village is divided into four hamlets: Cellena, Case Leoni, Case Perugini and Case Pietrini.

Main sights 
 Church of Santissima Annunziata, main parish church of the village, it was built in 1787 and entirely re-built in 1958.
 Corte Vecchia: ancient Etruscan settlement, it became a small burgh in the Early Middle Ages and it gave shelter to the troops of Frederick II Hohenstaufen during the siege of Sovana. In the Renaissance it was transformed into a farm estate with a villa and a giardino all'italiana. There is also a chapel which was the parish church (pieve) of Cellena before the edification of the modern church in the 18th century.

References

Bibliography 
 Aldo Mazzolai, Guida della Maremma. Percorsi tra arte e natura, Florence, Le Lettere, 1997.
 Giuseppe Guerrini, Torri e castelli della provincia di Grosseto, Siena, Nuova Immagine Editrice, 1999.

See also 
 Catabbio
 Petricci
 Rocchette di Fazio
 Semproniano

Frazioni of Semproniano